The 15th AARP Movies for Grownups Awards, presented by AARP the Magazine, honored films released in 2015 and were announced on January 5, 2016. The awards recognized films created by and about people over the age of 50. The ceremony, held a month later on February 8, 2016, was hosted by actress and comedian Kathy Griffin at the Beverly Wilshire Hotel.

Awards

Winners and Nominees

Winners are listed first, highlighted in boldface, and indicated with a double dagger.

Career Achievement Award
 Michael Douglas: "[F]rom his earliest days, beginning with the searing drama One Flew Over the Cuckoo's Nest, the two-time Oscar-winning actor/producer has challenged audiences to leave a movie theater with more than gum on their shoes."

Films with multiple nominations and awards

References

AARP Movies for Grownups Awards
AARP